Luko Vezilić is a former water polo player. As a member of Yugoslavia's water polo team he won a silver medal at the 1980 Summer Olympics.

See also
 Yugoslavia men's Olympic water polo team records and statistics
 List of Olympic medalists in water polo (men)
 List of men's Olympic water polo tournament goalkeepers

References

External links
 

1948 births
Living people
Yugoslav male water polo players
Water polo goalkeepers
Olympic medalists in water polo
Olympic silver medalists for Yugoslavia
Olympic water polo players of Yugoslavia
Water polo players at the 1980 Summer Olympics
Medalists at the 1980 Summer Olympics